German submarine U-757 was a Type VIIC U-boat built for Nazi Germany's Kriegsmarine for service during World War II. Laid down as yard number 140 at the Kriegsmarinewerft (KMW) in Wilhelmshaven, U-757 served with 6th U-boat Flotilla from 28 February 1942 until 8 January 1944 under the command of Korvettenkapitän Friedrich Deetz.

Design
German Type VIIC submarines were preceded by the shorter Type VIIB submarines. U-757 had a displacement of  when at the surface and  while submerged. She had two shafts and two  propellers.

U-757 was fitted with five  torpedo tubes (four fitted at the bow and one at the stern), fourteen torpedoes, one  SK C/35 naval gun, 220 rounds, and a  C/30 anti-aircraft gun. The boat had a complement of between forty-four and sixty.

Service history
U-757s first victims were the British transport vessel HMS LCT-2398 - destroying 291 tons of shipping - in the convoy HX 228, and the American merchant vessel William C. Gorgas- destroying a further 7,197 GRT of shipping. Both incidents occurred on 11 March 1943, fourteen days into her twenty-five-day-long third patrol. Of the seventy-three crewmen on board the Gorgas, twenty-two perished.

On her fourth patrol, U-757 sank the Norwegian Fernhill on 7 August 1943, thirty-one days into her sixty-day patrol, 4,116 GRT of shipping lost in the sea. Of the ship's forty-four crewmen, forty survived the attack, being rescued by the American tanker Idaho two days later.

Fate
On 8 January 1944 in the North Atlantic, south-west of Ireland, U-757 was hit by depth charges from the British frigate  and the Canadian corvette . U-757 went down with all 49 seamen, at position .

Wolfpacks
U-757 took part in five wolfpacks, namely:
 Panther (6 – 10 October 1942)
 Neuland (4 – 12 March 1943)
 Without name (11 – 29 July 1943)
 Rügen 5 (6 – 7 January 1944)
 Rügen (7 – 8 January 1944)

Summary of raiding history

References

Notes

Citations

Bibliography

External links

German Type VIIC submarines
U-boats commissioned in 1942
1941 ships
U-boats sunk in 1944
World War II submarines of Germany
U-boats sunk by depth charges
U-boats sunk by British warships
U-boats sunk by Canadian warships
Ships built in Wilhelmshaven
Ships lost with all hands
World War II shipwrecks in the Atlantic Ocean
Maritime incidents in January 1944